Gaverdovsky is a khutor in Koshekhablsky District, urban okrug of Maykop, Russia. The population was 3824 as of 2018. There are 65 streets.

Geography 
The khutor is located on the right bank of the Belaya River, 8 km west of Maykop (the district's administrative centre) by road. Maykop is the nearest rural locality.

Ethnicity 
The khutor is inhabited by Circassians, Greeks and Russians.

References 

Rural localities in Maykop Federal City